Robert Prince (May 10, 1929<ref>Kate Hevner Mueller, Twenty-Seven Major American Symphony Orchestras (Bloomington: Indiana University Studies, 1973), p. 263</ref> – March 4, 2007) was an American composer of music for dance, theater, television, film and records and a graduate of the Juilliard School. In addition to his work as composer and arranger he also performed on vibraphone and timpani.

 Dance and theater 
Prince is noted for composing the jazz-influenced music for N.Y. Export: Op. Jazz (1958) and Events (1961). These were groundbreaking modern ballets choreographed by Jerome Robbins for his company Ballets USA.

Prince also composed incidental music for the play Oh Dad, Poor Dad, Mamma's Hung You in the Closet and I'm Feelin' So Sad which Robbins directed off-Broadway in 1962. He also composed and arranged music for the musicals Something More! (1964), Half a Sixpence (1965) and The Office (1966).

 Film and television 
Prince composed the music for Francis Ford Coppola's 1966 film You're a Big Boy Now, the George Peppard film Newman's Law (1974), the cult horror film Squirm (1976) and the blaxploitation movie J. D.'s Revenge (1976), and wrote the music for TV movies such as Gargoyles (1972), The Return of Charlie Chan (1973), Scream, Pretty Peggy (1973), The Strange and Deadly Occurrence (1974), Where Have All the People Gone? (1974), The Dead Don't Die (1975) and Snowbeast (1977).

Throughout the 1960s and 1970s he composed background music for a variety of dramatic television series including episodes of The Wild Wild West, Mission: Impossible, Wonder Woman, The Streets of San Francisco, Columbo, Murder, She Wrote, and Rod Serling's Night Gallery.

 Jazz 
Prince was also active as a composer, arranger and producer in the jazz and pop field where he went by the name Bob Prince and contributed to several projects for Columbia Records in the 1950s.

Contracted to the Warner Bros. label in 1959 he released four albums under his own name. Notable among these albums is Saxes Inc. which is arranged for an ensemble of twelve saxophones and rhythm section and features some of the top New York jazz and studio players of the time including Phil Woods, Gene Quill, Al Cohn and Zoot Sims. There is also a guest appearance by Coleman Hawkins.

Prince's two compositions for Jerome Robbins are considered excellent examples of Third stream music, the blending of jazz and classical styles.

 Discography 

 As leader 

 What's New? New Jazz from Teo Macero and Bob Prince –  Columbia CL 842 (1956)
 The Bob Prince Quintet: Dancing with Oh Captain! – Harmony HL 7097 (1958)
 N.Y. Export: Op. Jazz from "Ballets U.S.A." and Ballet Music from Leonard Bernstein's "West Side Story" – Warner Bros. – 1240 (1959)
 Orchestral Moods of a Western Sunset – Warner Bros. – 1259 (1959)
 Charleston 1970 – Warner Bros. – 1276 (1959)
 Saxes Inc. – Warner Bros. – 1336 (1959)
 Events and N.Y Export: Op. Jazz – RCA Victor LPM/LSP-2435 (1961)

 As arranger and sideman 

 Johnny Mathis with Johnny Mathis – Columbia CL 887 (1956) arranger Far Out, Near In with Johnny Eaton – Columbia CL 996 (1956) vibraphone Desmond Blue with Paul Desmond – RCA Victor (1962) arranger''

References

External links 

Ballet composers
1929 births
2007 deaths
Timpanists
American percussionists
Juilliard School alumni
American film score composers
American television composers
20th-century American composers
20th-century American drummers
American male drummers
American male film score composers
20th-century American male musicians